The Bayer designation Eta Hydri (η Hyi / η Hydri) is shared by two stars, in the constellation Hydrus:

η¹ Hydri
η² Hydri

Hydri, Eta
Hydrus (constellation)